Anzab may refer to:

Anzab Tunnel, tunnel in Tajikistan
Anzab-e Olya, village in Iran
Anzab-e Sofla, village in Iran
 ANZAB, The Australian and New Zealand Association of Bellringers